Blitzen Trapper is the debut studio album by Blitzen Trapper. The deluxe reissue was released only on vinyl LP on April 20, 2013, for Record Store Day.

Track listing

Preview This Album

2013 Deluxe Edition Bonus Tracks

References 

Blitzen Trapper albums
2003 debut albums